Plecostomus, pleco, or plec refers to several species of freshwater loricariid catfish commonly sold as aquarium fish:

Hypostomus plecostomus
Hypostomus punctatus
Pterygoplichthys multiradiatus
Pterygoplichthys pardalis
Ancistrus cirrhosus

Pleco may also refer to:
Pleco Software, an English↔Chinese dictionary application for iOS and Android devices, which uses the traditional Chinese character for "fish" (魚  yú) in its icon.

See also
Plecostomus (disambiguation)